Andrey Mikalayavich Astrowski (Andrei Nikolayevich Ostrovskiy; born 13 September 1973) is a Belarusian football coach and a former player. He is an assistant manager of Volna Pinsk.

Astrowski made 52 appearances for the Belarus national football team from 1994 to 2005.

Honours
Dinamo Minsk
Belarusian Premier League champion: 1992–93, 1993–94, 1994–95, 1995
Belarusian Cup winner: 1993–94

Maccabi Haifa
Israeli Premier League champion: 2000–01, 2001–02

References

External links
 
 Profile of Andrei Ostrovskiy on Maccabi Haifa's official website 
 

1973 births
Living people
Sportspeople  from Pinsk
Belarusian footballers
Association football defenders
Belarus international footballers
Belarusian expatriate footballers
Expatriate footballers in Russia
Expatriate footballers in Israel
Expatriate footballers in Ukraine
Belarusian expatriate sportspeople in Ukraine
Belarusian expatriate sportspeople in Russia
Russian Premier League players
Ukrainian Premier League players
FC Dynamo Brest players
FC Dinamo Minsk players
FC Dynamo Moscow players
Maccabi Haifa F.C. players
FC Arsenal Kyiv players
FC Moscow players
FC Chornomorets Odesa players
Belarusian football managers
FC Volna Pinsk managers